Erica Moore (born March 25, 1988, in Seymour, Indiana) is an American middle-distance runner. She attended and graduated from Sullivan High School in Sullivan, Indiana, where her father was the boys basketball coach. She was a versatile athlete, establishing school records in at least six events in track and playing basketball.

She qualified for the Indiana state finals in three events and finished third in the 300-meter hurdles. She then won the 300-meter hurdles in the Midwest Meet of Champions.

NCAA

She matriculated to Indiana State University in Terre Haute, Indiana, where she had an outstanding career in track, competing primarily in the pentathlon and heptathlon and middle distance events, including the 400 meter-run, 800-meter run and 400-meter hurdles. As a senior in 2010 she was an All-America in the 800-meter run indoors and the 400-meter hurdles outdoors.

Nike

Erica won 2012 USA Indoor Championships in 2:01.08 running from the front wire-to-wire.
She got bronze medal at 800 metres event at 2012 IAAF World Indoor Championships in Istanbul, Turkey. Moore personal best at 800 m is 1:59.97 (2012).

Achievements

References

External links 

 
 GoSycamores profile

1988 births
Living people
American female middle-distance runners
People from Seymour, Indiana
People from Sullivan, Indiana
USA Indoor Track and Field Championships winners
21st-century American women

Track and field athletes from Indiana